Maulana Muhammad Gohar Shah (born 1 January 1950) is a Pakistani politician who had been a member of the National Assembly of Pakistan, from June 2013 to May 2018. Previously he had been a member of the National Assembly  from November 2002 to November 2007.

Early life
He was born on 1 January 1950.

Political career

He ran for the seat of the Provincial Assembly of Khyber Pakhtunkhwa as a candidate of Jamiat Ulema-e-Islam (F) (JUI-F) from Constituency PF-13 (Charsadda) in 1988 Pakistani general election, but was unsuccessful. He received 7,773 votes and lost the seat to a candidate of Awami National Party (ANP).

He ran for the seat of the Provincial Assembly of Khyber Pakhtunkhwa as a candidate of JUI-F from Constituency PF-13 (Charsadda) in 1990 Pakistani general election, but was unsuccessful. He received 12,457 votes and lost the seat to a candidate of ANP.

He ran for the seat of the Provincial Assembly of Khyber Pakhtunkhwa as a candidate of Islami Jamhoori Mahaz (IJM) from Constituency PF-13 (Charsadda) in 1993 Pakistani general election, but was unsuccessful. He received 8.728 votes and lost the seat to a candidate of ANP.

Shah ran for the seat of National Assembly of Pakistan as a candidate of JUI-F from Constituency NA-5 (Charsadda) in 1997 Pakistani general election, but was unsuccessful. He received 34,733 votes and lost the seat to Asfandyar Wali Khan.

Shah was elected to the National Assembly as a candidate of Muttahida Majlis-e-Amal (MMA) from Constituency NA-7 (Charsadda-I) in 2002 Pakistani general election. He received 55,917 votes and defeated Asfandyar Wali Khan.

He ran for the seat of the Provincial Assembly of Khyber Pakhtunkhwa as a candidate of MMA from Constituency PK-20 (Charsadda-IV) in 2008 Pakistani general election, but was unsuccessful. He secured 4,860 votes and lost the seat to Aftab Ahmad Khan Sherpao.

Shah was re-elected to the National Assembly as a candidate of JUI-F from Constituency NA-7 (Charsadda-I) in 2013 Pakistani general election. He received 53,610 votes and defeated a candidate of Pakistan Tehreek-e-Insaf.

References

Living people
Jamiat Ulema-e-Islam (F) politicians
Pashtun people
People from Charsadda District, Pakistan
Pakistani MNAs 2013–2018
1950 births
Pakistani MNAs 2002–2007